Bennett John Stanley Steele (born 5 August 1939) is an English former professional footballer who played as a left winger in the Football League.

References

Sources

1939 births
Living people
People from Cramlington
Footballers from Northumberland
English footballers
Association football wingers
Everton F.C. players
Chesterfield F.C. players
Gateshead F.C. players
Farsley Celtic A.F.C. players
English Football League players
Gateshead A.F.C. players